The 1988 Hi-Tec British Open Championships was held at the Wembley Squash Centre with the later stages being held at the Wembley Conference Centre from 11–18 April 1988. Jahangir Khan won his seventh consecutive title defeating Rodney Martin in the final in seven sets.

Seeds

Draw and results

Final Qualifying round

Main draw

References

Men's British Open Squash Championships
Men's British Open
Men's British Open Squash Championship
Men's British Open Squash Championship
Men's British Open Squash Championship
Squash competitions in London